F-15 Strike Eagle is an F-15 Strike Eagle combat flight simulator originally released for the Atari 8-bit family in 1984 by MicroProse then ported to other systems. It is the first in the F-15 Strike Eagle series followed by F-15 Strike Eagle II and F-15 Strike Eagle III. An arcade version of the game was released simply as F-15 Strike Eagle in 1991, which uses higher-end hardware than was available in home systems, including the TMS34010 graphics-oriented CPU.

Gameplay

The game begins with the player selecting Libya (much like Operation El Dorado Canyon), the Persian Gulf, or Vietnam as a mission theater.  Play then begins from the cockpit of an F-15 already in flight and equipped with a variety of missiles, bombs, drop tanks, flares and chaff. The player flies the plane in combat to bomb various targets including a primary and secondary target while also engaging in air-to-air combat with enemy fighters. 

The game ends when either the player's plane crashes, is destroyed, or when the player returns to base.

Ports

The game was first released for the Atari 8-bit family, with ports appearing from 1985-87 for the Apple II, Commodore 64, ZX Spectrum, MSX, and Amstrad CPC. It was also ported to the IBM PC as a self-booting disk, being one of the first games that MicroProse company released for IBM compatibles. The initial IBM release came on a self-booting 5.25" floppy disk and supported only CGA graphics, but a revised version in 1986 was offered on 3.5" disks and added limited EGA support (which added the ability to change color palettes if an EGA card was present).

Versions for the Game Boy, Game Gear, and NES were published in the early 1990s.

Reception
F-15 Strike Eagle was a commercial blockbuster. It sold 250,000 copies by March 1987, and surpassed 1 million units in 1989. It ultimately reached over 1.5 million sales overall, and was MicroProse's best-selling Commodore game as of late 1987. Computer Gaming World in 1984 called F-15 "an excellent simulation" with "excellent documentation". It stated that "the action is fast and furious ... the graphics are excellent". The game won the "Action game of the Year" in the magazine's 1985 reader poll. In a 1994 survey of wargames the magazine gave the title two stars out of five, stating that "The first 'classic' fighter simulation" was "well loved in its time" but "extremely dated". Antic approved of the Atari ST version's graphical and speed improvements, and ability to save progress. Compute! listed the game in 1988 as one of "Our Favorite Games", stating that it "makes jet fighter combat nerve-wracking and fun at the same time".

References

External links

 
The Official F-15 Strike Eagle Handbook at FlightSimBooks.com

1984 video games
Amiga games
Amstrad CPC games
Apple II games
Arcade video games
Atari 8-bit family games
Atari ST games
Cold War video games
Combat flight simulators
Commodore 64 games
Game Boy games
Game Gear games
MicroProse games
MSX games
Nintendo Entertainment System games
NMS Software games
Sid Meier games
Single-player video games
U.S. Gold games
Video games developed in the United States
Video games set in Iran
Video games set in Libya
Video games set in Vietnam
ZX Spectrum games